Joseph Henry McAlpin Benrimo (1874–1942) was an American actor, playwright, and director. He often went by the name J. Harry Benrimo. Among his plays are The Yellow Jacket and The Willow Tree; the latter was made into a film in 1920. He directed The Blue Paradise in its original Broadway production at the Casino Theatre beginning in August 1915. He also staged the musical comedy operetta The Well of Romance in 1930.

Sources
J. Harry Benrimo listing in Chief Contemporary Dramatists. Thomas H.Dickinson, editor. Boston: Houghton Mifflin, 1921: 720.

External links

American dramatists and playwrights
American male actors
1874 births
1942 deaths